Eriocraniella trigona is a moth of the family Eriocraniidae. It was described by Davis in 1978. It is found in California.

The wingspan is 6–8 mm. The forewings and fringe are uniformly fuscous with a bronzy to purplish iridescence. The hindwings are paler in color, more grayish and less iridescent and the scales are moderately broad. Adults are on wing in mid May in one generation per year.

References

Moths described in 1978
Eriocraniidae